Thomas Babington of Rothley Temple (18 December 1758 – 21 November 1837) was an English philanthropist and politician. He was a member of the Clapham Sect, alongside more famous abolitionists such as William Wilberforce and Hannah More. An active anti-slavery campaigner, he had reservations about the participation of women associations in the movement.

Early life and education
He was the eldest son of Thomas Babington of Rothley Temple, Leicestershire, from whom he inherited Rothley and other land in Leicestershire in 1776. He was part of the Babington family. He was educated at Rugby School and St John's College, Cambridge where he met William Wilberforce and other prominent anti-slavery agitators.

Anti-slavery and philanthropy
Babington was an evangelical Christian of independent means who devoted himself to a number of good causes. His home at Rothley Temple was regularly used by Wilberforce and associates for abolitionist meetings, and it was where the bill to abolish slavery was drafted. There is a stone memorial to commemorate to this on the front lawn of Rothley which still stands today.

Babington's base in London was 17 Downing Street. He shared use of this residence with his brother-in-law, General Colin Macaulay who was similarly active in the abolitionist cause.

In addition to his anti-slavery work, he also offered to pay half the cost of smallpox inoculation for people in Rothley in 1784–5. He set up a local Friendly Society to purchase corn for sale to the poor at a lower price to improve the lives and diet of his estate workers. Trusts he set up to provide housing in local villages still exist today. 
 
Babington was active politically, and supported moves to extend voting rights to more people. He was High Sheriff of Leicestershire in 1780 and  MP for Leicester from 1800 to 1818.

Family

On 8 October 1787 Babington married Jean Macaulay, daughter of the Rev. John Macaulay (1720-1789) of Cardross, Dumbartonshire. Jean came from a family who like Babington, were prominently involved in the anti-slavery movement. This included two brothers Zachary Macaulay, and General Colin Macaulay: Thomas Babington Macaulay was Jean's nephew. Thomas and Jean had six sons and four daughters:

Thomas Gisborne Babington (1788–1871)
Rev. John Babington (1791–?)
Matthew Babington, JP (1792–?)
George Gisborne Babington, FRCS (1794–1856)
William Henry Babington, E.I.C.C.S (1803–1867)
Lieutenant Charles Roos Babington (1806–1826)
Lydia Rose Babington
Jean Babington (–1839)
Mary Babington (1799–1858), wife of Sir James Parker, Vice-Chancellor
Margaret Anne Babington (–1819)

Babington died at Rothley Temple in 1837 at the age of 78, and is buried in the chapel there. His wife Jean died on 21 September 1845.

References

1758 births
1837 deaths
People from Rothley
People educated at Rugby School
Alumni of St John's College, Cambridge
English abolitionists
Evangelical Anglicans
Members of the Parliament of Great Britain for English constituencies
Members of the Parliament of the United Kingdom for English constituencies
UK MPs 1801–1802
UK MPs 1802–1806
UK MPs 1806–1807
UK MPs 1807–1812
UK MPs 1812–1818
British MPs 1796–1800
English philanthropists
Clapham Sect
High Sheriffs of Leicestershire
Thomas
Christian abolitionists